Archery at the Pacific Games was first contested at the 1971 games at Papeete. Archery was made a core sport in 2021, and is thus required to be included at every subsequent edition of the Pacific Games. It has also been included in the Pacific Mini Games, firstly at Norfolk Island in 2001 and then Port Vila in 2017.

Pacific Games
Flag icons and three letter country code indicate the nationality of the gold medal winner of an event, where this information is known; otherwise an (X) is used. Moving the cursor onto a country code with a dotted underline will reveal the name of the gold medal winner. A dash (–) indicates an event that was not contested.

Outdoor range

Winners: Recurve bow

Winners: Compound bow

Indoor and Field

Winners: Recurve

Winners: Compound

Pacific Mini Games

Outdoor

Recurve bow

Compound bow

Field and indoor

Recurve

Compound

See also
Archery at the Asian Games
Archery at the Summer Olympics

Notes

References

 
Pacific Games
Pacific Games